Brown Mountain is a mountain in Schoharie County, New York. It is located southeast of North Blenheim. Reed Hill is located southwest and Safford Hill is located northeast of Brown Mountain.

References

Mountains of Schoharie County, New York
Mountains of New York (state)